Wellsburg is an unincorporated community in Bracken County, Kentucky, United States.

References

Unincorporated communities in Bracken County, Kentucky
Unincorporated communities in Kentucky